Blood + Dope + Sin + Gold is a 2007 remix album by industrial music group My Life with the Thrill Kill Kult. It features remixes from The Filthiest Show in Town, Gay, Black and Married, and The Reincarnation of Luna.

Track listing

Personnel
Buzz McCoy – producer, remixer (tracks 1–4, 6–10, 12)
Track 5 remixed by Dirty Sanchez
Track 11 remixed by Justin Bennett

Release
This physical CD was only available at the merchandise booth on the 2007 tour but the tracks are now available as digital downloads from SleazeBox Records.

References

External links

2007 remix albums
My Life with the Thrill Kill Kult albums
Industrial remix albums